The Quintana Roo Speleological Survey (QRSS) was established in 1990 for the safe exploration, survey and cartography of the underwater and dry caves and cenotes of Quintana Roo, Mexico, supported by the National Speleological Society. 

The geographical area for the data archived in the QRSS is essentially the whole of the state of Quintana Roo, which extends along the Caribbean coast of the Yucatán Peninsula, from Cancun and south to the capital of Chetumal situated on the border with Belize. The explosive urban and tourism based development within the Riviera Maya and the Costa Maya is leading to increasing and widespread environmental stresses. The documentation of the flooded and dry cave networks and cenotes provided by the QRSS is of fundamental importance in regional and site specific scale planning and management of development, water resources, waste disposal facilities, hazardous material handling site selection, and so forth. Certified cave divers may obtain an information package on underwater survey and cartography opportunities in Quintana Roo.

See also
Quintana Roo Speleological Survey— The underwater caves system in Quintana Roo Mexico

References

 

Speleology
Geography of Quintana Roo
Natural history of Quintana Roo
Sistema Sac Actun and Sistema Dos Ojos
Environmental organizations based in Mexico
Non-profit organizations based in Mexico
Environmental organizations established in 1990
1990 establishments in Mexico